Carol Ann Dalton (born September 2, 1950) is an American former magistrate judge and associate judge on the Superior Court of the District of Columbia.

Education and career 
Dalton attended Cardinal Spellman High School, graduating in June 1968. She earned her Bachelor of Arts in psychology from City College of New York in June 1972, Juris Doctor from New York Law School in June 1986 and her Master of Laws degree in tax law from George Washington University’s National Law Center in June 1990.

After graduating, she worked in private practice.

D.C. Superior Court 
In April 2002, Dalton was appointed as a magistrate judge on the Superior Court of the District of Columbia pursuant to the Family Court Act of 2001 which created the seat.

On November 9, 2005, President George W. Bush nominated her to be an associate judge on the same court. Her nomination expired on December 9, 2006, with the end of the 109th United States Congress.

President George W. Bush renominated her on January 9, 2007, to a 15-year term as an associate judge on the Superior Court of the District of Columbia to the seat vacated by Noël A. Kramer. On July 23, 2008, the Senate Committee on Homeland Security and Governmental Affairs held a hearing on her nomination. On July 30, 2008, the Committee reported her nomination favorably to the Senate floor. On August 1, 2008, the full Senate confirmed her nomination by voice vote.

References

1950 births
Living people
Cardinal Spellman High School (New York City) alumni
City College of New York alumni
New York Law School alumni
Lawyers from New York City
George Washington University Law School alumni
21st-century American judges
21st-century American women judges
Judges of the Superior Court of the District of Columbia